The Caddy is a 1953 American semi-musical-comedy-sports film starring the comedy team of Martin and Lewis. It is noteworthy for Dean Martin introducing the hit song "That's Amore".

Plot
Harvey Miller, whose father was a famous golf pro, is expected to follow in his footsteps, but Harvey is afraid of crowds.  Instead, at the advice of his fiancée Lisa, Harvey becomes a golf instructor. Lisa's brother Joe becomes Harvey's first client and becomes good enough to start playing in tournaments, with Harvey tagging along as his caddie.  They encounter a wealthy socialite who Joe wins over.

Joe's success goes to his head and he begins to treat Harvey poorly. They begin to quarrel and cause a disruption at a tournament, so Joe is disqualified. However, a talent agent witnesses the comical spectacle and advises that they go into show business.

Harvey conquers his fear and they become successful entertainers. At the end, Harvey and Joe meet up with another comedy team who look just like them: Martin and Lewis!

Cast

Dean Martin as Joe Anthony
Jerry Lewis as Harvey Miller Jr.
Donna Reed as Kathy Taylor
Barbara Bates as Lisa Anthony
Joseph Calleia as Papa Anthony
Fred Clark as Mr. Baxter aka Old Skinhead
Clinton Sundberg as Charles, Butler
Howard Smith as Golf Official
Marshall Thompson as Bruce Reeber
Marjorie Gateson as Mrs. Grace Taylor
Frank Puglia as Mr. Spezzato
Lewis Martin as Mr. Taylor
Argentina Brunetti as Mama Anthony
John Gallaudet as Jonathan Bell
William Edmunds as Caminello
Henry Brandon as Mr. Preen
Tom Harmon as himself (Golf Announcer)
Nancy Kulp as Emma, Drunk's Wife

This movie is notable for cameo appearances by some of the leading professional golfers of the era (all playing themselves), including Ben Hogan, Sam Snead, Byron Nelson, and Julius Boros.

Production

Filming
It was filmed from November 24, 1952 through February 23, 1953 and was released by Paramount Pictures on August 10, 1953. It was later re-released in 1964 on a double bill with another Dean Martin and Jerry Lewis picture, You're Never Too Young (1955).

This was the team's first film since At War with the Army (1950) to be produced by their own production company, York Pictures Corporation. During shooting, on January 8, 1953 production was suspended for 23 days when Lewis entered Cedars of Lebanon Hospital with a fever. The movie became Martin and Lewis' most expensive to date.

Music
The score for the film includes the hit "That's Amore", sung by Dean Martin. It was nominated for an Oscar for Best Original Song, but lost to "Secret Love" from Calamity Jane.

Promotion
The team made a promotional radio message for the movie.  Several outtakes, available on The Golden Age of Comedy: Dean Martin and Jerry Lewis CD, feature Dean and Jerry trying to get through five lines of dialogue. When either one of them messed up a line, they exchanged several lines of profanity.

Reception
On Rotten Tomatoes, the film holds an 83% rating from six reviews, with an average score of 5.8/10.

Home media
The film was included on an eight-film DVD set, the Dean Martin and Jerry Lewis Collection: Volume One, released on October 31, 2006.

Impact
The career of Donna Reed began a huge upswing following the release of The Caddy. Five days prior to the film's release, Columbia Pictures released From Here to Eternity, starring Reed. Reed went on to win an Academy Award for Best Supporting Actress for From Here to Eternity. Both films were shown in theaters during the same time period and both were hugely successful.

See also
 List of American films of 1953

References

External links
 
 
 

1953 films
1950s sports comedy films
American sports comedy films
American black-and-white films
1950s English-language films
Films directed by Norman Taurog
Golf films
Paramount Pictures films
1953 comedy films
1950s American films